Enterspace is an outdoor stainless steel sculpture by Maurice Lemieux, installed in front of the building at 2000 Peel Street at the corner of De Maisonneuve Boulevard, near Montreal's Peel station exit, in Quebec, Canada.

References

External links
 

Downtown Montreal
Outdoor sculptures in Montreal
Stainless steel sculptures